Meers is an unincorporated community located on State Highway 115 in Comanche County, Oklahoma, United States, in the foothills of the Wichita Mountains. Founded as a gold mining town in 1901, it was named for mine operator Andrew J. Meers. The only remaining structure of the original town is the Meers Store & Restaurant, which Food Network named as the best hamburger joint in Oklahoma and one of the best in the United States, largely due to its signature MeersBurger. The Meers Store also served as the area post office from March 12, 1902, until February, 1989. Currently, area residents have Lawton mailing addresses. Meers lies on the Meers Fault. In 1985, in order to monitor seismic activity, the Oklahoma Geological Survey installed a seismograph in the Meers Store.

Listing as National Register of Historic Places
The Meers Store was listed on the National Register of Historic Places in 1978 as Meers Mining Camp, since it was the only surviving relic of the community's gold rush days.

References

Bibliography

External links
 

Unincorporated communities in Comanche County, Oklahoma
Unincorporated communities in Oklahoma
National Register of Historic Places in Comanche County, Oklahoma
Populated places established in 1901
1901 establishments in Indian Territory